The Bazi Bridge is a stone arch bridge in Shaoxing, Zhejiang, China. The bridge is named for its shape like the Chinese character "" ("eight").

History
The bridge was originally built in the Jiatai period (1201–1204) of the Song dynasty (960–1279). It was rebuilt in 1256 during the ruling of Emperor Lizong. In 1763, in the reign of Qianlong Emperor in the Qing dynasty (1644–1911), it was repaired and renovated. The last maintenance was in 1982. On June 25, 2001, it was listed among the fifth group of "Major National Historical and Cultural Sites in Zhejiang" by the State Council of China.

Architecture

References

Bridges in Zhejiang
Arch bridges in China
Bridges completed in the 13th century
Song dynasty architecture
Buildings and structures completed in 1256
Major National Historical and Cultural Sites in Zhejiang
1256 establishments in Asia
13th-century establishments in China